The K.C. Irving Regional Centre is an indoor arena located in Bathurst, New Brunswick. The arena is home to the Acadie–Bathurst Titan, a hockey team of the QMJHL. It was named in honour of businessman K. C. Irving. Opened in September 1996 and built at a cost of $21 million, it is the largest arena in north-eastern New Brunswick.

Around the rink there are 24 private boxes. The arena has two ice rinks: "The Eddy Rink" where the Acadie-Bathurst Titan play their home games on also where the seating capacity is located, and "The Richelieu" rink which is the home of The Bathurst High School Phantoms Boys and Girls hockey teams and is hosts to many minor hockey, figure skating and other events with a smaller seating area. The centre also has many canteens and a walking track as well as an Acadie-Bathurst Titan gift shop and the offices of the Acadie-Bathurst Titan management and the City Of Bathurst Parks, Recreation and Tourism Department. The operations of the centre are run by the City Of Bathurst and their union workers from CUPE Locals 550 (Outside Workers) and CUPE Local 4632 Kc Irving Event staff and Security

Banners
President's Cup
(including President's Cup of the club when the franchise was operating at Laval)
 1983-84
 1988-89
 1989-90
 1992-93
 1998-99

" Hardy Cup" 
""(Won by the 1972 Bathurst Alpine Papermakers) at the former Bathurst Arena also known as "The Barn"
Note
The Hardy Cup, was the Canadian national Intermediate "A" ice hockey championship from 1967 until 1984. From 1985 until 1990, the Hardy Cup was the Canadian national senior championship for Senior "AA" after senior and intermediate hockey were merged by the Canadian Amateur Hockey Association. The trophy was retired to the Hockey Hall of Fame in 1990.

Retired numbers
(including players of the club when the franchise was operating at Laval)
10 - Claude Lapointe
17 - Mike Bossy
19 - Neil Carnes
21 - Vincent Damphousse
22 - Martin Lapointe
30 - Gino Odjick
37 - Patrice Bergeron *First Retired jersey from The Acadie Bathurst Titan since relocating from Laval PQ
66 - Mario Lemieux
 1  - Roberto Luongo* Second retired jersey from The Acadie Bathurst Titan since relocating from Laval PQ

References

Buildings and structures in Bathurst, New Brunswick
Indoor ice hockey venues in Canada
Sport in Bathurst, New Brunswick
Sports venues in New Brunswick
Indoor arenas in New Brunswick
Quebec Major Junior Hockey League arenas
1996 establishments in New Brunswick
Sports venues completed in 1996